Milan Lednický (born 15 May 1968) is a retired footballer, who played as a forward, and a FIFA-licensed players' agent.

Club career
Lednický began playing professional football with TJ Plastika Nitra in 1986. He would spend four seasons with the club before moving to FK Inter Bratislava for two seasons and then returning to Nitra two more seasons, appearing in 132 league matches for the club. He would join second division side FK Coring Bohumín in 1994.

Lednický moved to Germany in July 1995, joining German second division side 1. FSV Mainz 05 for one season. He went on to the Czech Republic in 1997, where he played one season in the Gambrinus liga for Lázně Bohdaneč. He would also have a spell in Cyprus with Anagennisi Dherynia.

References

External links

FIFA Players Agents List: Slovakia

1968 births
Living people
Slovak footballers
FC Nitra players
FK Inter Bratislava players
1. FSV Mainz 05 players
Czech First League players
AFK Atlantic Lázně Bohdaneč players
Association football forwards
Sportspeople from Považská Bystrica